Sławosz is a Polish given name
 Sławosz Szydłowski (1894–1952), Polish athlete
 Sławosz Uznański /pl/fr/ (born 1984), Polish astronaut (European Astronaut Corps)

References

Slavic masculine given names
Polish masculine given names